The Dornier Do 23 was a German medium bomber of the 1930s.

Design and development
The earlier Do 11 had exhibited several problems, so two initiatives were launched to address those shortcomings. The first resulted in the Do 13. The second effort was a more extensive rework which resulted in the Do 23. With additional landing flaps at the rear of the wings several of the handling problems were corrected, but crew and military equipment were analogous to the Do 11 and performance was still considered mediocre.

Between 1934 and 1935 282 Dornier Do 23s were built for the Luftwaffe of which 273 were assigned to the units. In 1936 the machines were replaced by the first versions of the Do 17 and were transferred to the training duties. During the war, some Do 23s were used as minesweepers, known as Minensuch — literally, "mine-search" aircraft in German — and fitted with a current-carrying degaussing ring under the airframe to create a magnetic field that triggered submerged naval mines. These aircraft were usually given an -"MS" suffix to designate them, as had been done with the similarly equipped Bv 138 MS or Ju 52MS aircraft.

Experiments with spraying devices to blow off chemical warfare agents were also carried out with Do 23 with some aircraft used to fight pests.

Variants
First aircraft received letters A, C, E and F which were designation of aircraft, not variants. The only production version was G.

Do 23A: Aircraft WNr.231, registered as D-2485.
Do 23C: Aircraft WNr.293, registered as D-AHYL.
Do 23E: Aircraft WNr.294, registered as D-AGIR.
Do 23F: Aircraft WNr.295, used for stress and vibration tests.
Do 23G: Production version, manufactured in the Dornier main plants in Wismar and Friedrichshafen. Henschel and Blohm & Voss were also involved in the production with 24 aircraft each.

Operators

Luftwaffe

Royal Hungarian Air Force

Specifications (Do 23G)

See also

References

 

Do 023
1930s German bomber aircraft
World War II medium bombers of Germany
Aircraft first flown in 1934
Twin piston-engined tractor aircraft